Mohammadabad Rural District is in the Central District of Karaj County, Alborz province, Iran. At the census of 2006, its population was 22,099 in 5,788 households, and in the most recent census of 2016, it had decreased to 11,939 in 2,293 households. The largest of its 13 villages was Aliabad-e Guneh, with 3,256 people.

References 

Karaj County

Rural Districts of Alborz Province

Populated places in Alborz Province

Populated places in Karaj County